The North Carolina Department of Military and Veterans Affairs (DMVA) is a state agency designed to advocate for the relationship the state has with its military and veterans' installations and populations. It was created by the North Carolina General Assembly with the support of Governor Pat McCrory. The current head of the Department is Secretary Walter E. Gaskin. Prior to the creation of the Department, the Division of Veterans Affairs was under the Department of Administration while all military-related matters fell under the Department of Commerce.

History

Division of Military Affairs

Division of Veterans Affairs

Organizational structure

Office of the Secretary

Division of Veterans Affairs

Military Affairs Commission

Economic Impact

Budget

Recent Achievements

Related legislation

See also

Government of North Carolina

References

Government of North Carolina
State agencies of North Carolina
Military and Veterans
2015 establishments in North Carolina